Admiral Sir Bertram Home Ramsay, KCB, KBE, MVO (20 January 1883 – 2 January 1945) was a Royal Navy officer.  He commanded the destroyer  during the First World War.  In the Second World War, he was responsible for the Dunkirk evacuation in 1940 and planning and commanding the naval forces in the invasion of France in 1944.

Personal life
Ramsay was born in Hampton Court Palace, into an old family (see Ramsay Baronets). His parents were Brigadier General William Alexander Ramsay and Susan Newcombe Minchener. He attended Colchester Royal Grammar School.

On 26 February 1929, Ramsay married Helen Margaret Menzies, daughter of Colonel Charles Thomson Menzies. They had two sons, 
 David Francis Ramsay (1 October 1933 – 2 January 2021) who wrote two books and had two children, Michael Ramsay and James Ramsay.
 Major General Charles Alexander Ramsay CB OBE (12 October 1936 – 31 December 2017) was educated at the Royal Military Academy Sandhurst and rose to become Director General of the Territorial Army and was a member of the Queen's Body Guard for Scotland.

Early naval career
Ramsay joined the Royal Navy in 1898. Later serving on HMS Britannia, he became a midshipman within a year. By the middle of 1902 he was an acting sub-lieutenant, and he was confirmed in this rank on 15 September 1902. He was promoted to lieutenant on 15 December 1904.

The Census 1911 reveals him serving as Flag Lieutenant to Rear Admiral Douglas Gamble on HMS Bacchante (1901) in the Mediterranean.  The ship was captained at the time by Reginald Tyrwhitt.

First World War
During the First World War, Ramsay was given his first command, a small monitor, in August 1915. For two years his ship was part of the Dover Patrol off the Belgian coast. Promoted to commander on 30 June 1916, in October 1917 he took command of another Dover Patrol vessel, the destroyer . On 9 May 1918, his ship took part in the Second Ostend Raid, a follow up to the Zeebrugge Raid, for which he was mentioned in despatches.

Second World War
Ramsay retired from the navy in 1938, but was coaxed out of retirement by Winston Churchill one year later to help deal with the Axis threat. Promoted to vice-admiral, he was named Commander-in-Chief, Dover, on 24 August 1939. His duties included overseeing the defence against possible destroyer raids, the protection of cross-Channel military traffic and the denial of the passage through the Straits of Dover by submarines.

Operation Dynamo

As Vice-Admiral Dover, Ramsay was responsible for the Dunkirk evacuation, codenamed Operation Dynamo. Working from the tunnels beneath Dover Castle, he and his staff worked for nine days straight to rescue troops trapped in France by the German forces. For his success in bringing home 338,226 British and allied soldiers from the beaches of Dunkirk, he was asked to personally report on the operation to King George VI and was made a Knight Commander of the Order of the Bath.

Defending Dover
After Operation Dynamo was completed, he was faced with the enormous problems of defending the waters off Dover from the expected German invasion. For nearly two years, he commanded forces striving to maintain control against the Germans, gaining a second Mention in Despatches.  Ramsay was in command when the German battleships  and  together with escorts passed through the Channel in February 1942.  Though the British had made plans to deal with this (Operation Fuller), British forces were taken by surprise, and failed in their efforts to stop them.

Operation Torch

Ramsay was to be appointed the Naval Force Commander for the invasion of Europe on 29 April 1942, but the invasion was postponed and he was transferred to become deputy naval commander of the Allied invasion of North Africa.

Operation Husky

During the Allied invasion of Sicily (Operation Husky) in July 1943, Ramsay was Naval Commanding Officer, Eastern Task Force, and prepared the amphibious landings.

Operation Neptune

Ramsay was reinstated to the Active List on 26 April 1944 and promoted to the rank of admiral on 27 April 1944. He was appointed Naval Commander-in-Chief of the Allied Naval Expeditionary Force for the invasion.

In this, he executed what has been described by historian Correlli Barnett as a "never surpassed masterpiece of planning" — coordinating and commanding a fleet of almost 7,000 vessels to delivering over 160,000 men onto the beaches of Normandy on D-Day alone, with over 875,000 disembarked by the end of June.

He defused a potential conflict between Prime Minister Winston Churchill and the British Sovereign, King George VI, when Churchill informed the King that he intended to observe the D-Day landings from aboard , a cruiser assigned to bombardment duties for the operation. The King, himself a seasoned sailor and a veteran of the Battle of Jutland in the First World War, likewise announced that he would accompany his Prime Minister. The two were at civil loggerheads until meeting with Admiral Ramsay, who flatly refused to take responsibility for the safety of either of them. Ramsay cited the danger to both the King and the Prime Minister, the risks of the planned operational duties of HMS Belfast, and the fact that both the King and Churchill would be needed at home in case the landings went badly and immediate decisions were required. This settled the matter and both Churchill and King George VI remained ashore on D-Day.

While the port of Antwerp was vital for the Allies after D-Day, Admirals Cunningham and Ramsay warned SHAEF and Montgomery that the port was of no use while the Germans held the approaches. But Montgomery postponed the Battle of the Scheldt, and the delay in opening the port was a grave blow to the Allied build-up before winter approached.

Death
On 2 January 1945, Ramsay was killed when his plane crashed on takeoff at Toussus-le-Noble Airport southwest of Paris. He was en route to a conference with General Bernard Montgomery in Brussels. Ramsay was interred in Saint-Germain-en-Laye New Communal Cemetery. A memorial to all who died in the crash was erected at Toussus-le-Noble in May 1995.

Awards
Mentioned in Despatches – 1918, 1940
Knight Commander of the Bath (KCB) – 1940
Knight Commander of the Order of the British Empire (KBE)
Member of the Royal Victorian Order (MVO)
Grand Officier of the Légion d'honneur
Chief Commander of the Legion of Merit (United States) For gallant and distinguished service whilst in command of the invasion operations on Normandy
Order of Ushakov, First Class (USSR) – 1944

Legacy

A statue of Ramsay was erected in November 2000 at Dover Castle, close to where he had planned the Dunkirk evacuation. His name also appears on the Colchester Royal Grammar School war memorial and a portrait hangs in the school. A secondary school in Middlesbrough was named in his honour, but has since been renamed at least twice. 

In February 2020, the Scottish Borders Council announced plans to build a museum at the family home of Admiral Ramsay. "A former garden store will be converted at Bughtrig House in Coldstream to create the museum in his honour," BBC News reported.

In film and fiction
His involvement in the Dunkirk evacuation and the D-Day landings has led to several appearances as a character in film and television drama – in Dunkirk (1958, played by Nicholas Hannen), The Longest Day (1962, played by John Robinson), Churchill and the Generals (1979, played by Noel Johnson), Dunkirk (2004, played by Richard Bremmer), Ike: Countdown to D-Day (2004, played by Kevin J. Wilson), Churchill (played by George Anton) and Darkest Hour (2017, played by David Bamber).

References

Further reading
Barnett, Correlli (1991). Engage the Enemy More Closely: The Royal Navy in the Second World War. Norton & Company. London.
Woodward, David (1957). Ramsay at War. The Fighting Life of Admiral Sir Bertram Ramsay. – London: W. Kimber.

External links

 "D-Day's 'forgotten man' ", University of Cambridge, 2014. Short film on Ramsay's role in the Allied invasion of occupied France.
The Papers of Admiral Sir Bertram Home Ramsay held at Churchill Archives Centre

1883 births
1945 deaths
People educated at Colchester Royal Grammar School
Royal Navy admirals of World War II
Knights Commander of the Order of the Bath
Knights Commander of the Order of the British Empire
Members of the Royal Victorian Order
Chief Commanders of the Legion of Merit
Grand Officiers of the Légion d'honneur
Recipients of the Order of Ushakov, 1st class
Military personnel from London
Royal Navy officers of World War I
Graduates of the Royal College of Defence Studies
Royal Navy personnel killed in World War II
Victims of aviation accidents or incidents in France
Victims of aviation accidents or incidents in 1945
Foreign recipients of the Legion of Merit